Throb (or sylized as Throb.) is the third studio album by haloblack, released on February 16, 2004 by Armalyte Industries and The Sick City. The album's recording began after Bryan Barton moved from Minneapolis to London in the late 1990s. Barton became inspired to return to his musical roots and compose again after extensively listening to electronic music and Tricky's 1995 album Maxinquaye. The album was made with collaborative efforts of musicians Kraig Tyler, Charles Levi, Raymond Watts, and Olivier Grasse.

Reception 
Release Magazine gave Throb eight out of ten "R's", calling the music "strikingly inventive" and "consistently good." C. Parker of The Wire criticized the mediocre writing and said "from the crackling interference, supine adolescent questioning and maladroit thudding of "Why?" through to the soggy bassline on the closing "Drugbeat". this is one long, unalleviated exercise in gloom and despondency."

Track listing

Personnel 
Adapted from the Throb liner notes.

haloblack
 Bryan Barton (as Bryan Black) – production, mastering, vocals (2, 3, 5, 8, 9, 11, 12)

Additional performers
 Toby Doig – feedback (9, 11)
 Jules Hodgson – guitar (5)
 Charles Levi – bass guitar (6)
 Jun Onose (as J) – bass guitar (7)
 Arianne Schreiber – production, vocals (3-7, 9, 12)
 Krayge Tyler – production, guitar (3, 4, 7, 12)

Production and design
 Olivier Grasset – additional production (3), additional programming (5)
 Sachiko Tozawa – mastering
 Raymond Watts – production (5), vocals (7)

Release history

References

External links 
 
 Throb at Bandcamp
 Throb at Discogs (list of releases)

2004 albums
Haloblack albums